Chrysanthemums is a 1914 short film directed by Pyotr Chardynin.

Plot 

The film tells about the ballerina Vera Nevolina, the enamored big debtor Vladimir. Vera wants to help Vladimir repay his debts and offers him her jewels, but Vladimir starts courting a young and rich widow in the hope that she will marry him and he will pay off with all his debts.

Starring 
 Vera Karalli as Vera Alekseevna Nevolina, the dancer
 Ivan Mozzhukhin as Vladimir
 Raisa Reyzen as Widow (as R. Reisen)
 Sofya Goslavskaya (as S. Goslavskaya)
 Lidiya Tridenskaya
 Aleksandr Kheruvimov as Administrator of the theatre

Remake 
In 2009 an amateur remake of the film was made — a picture "Pietà" (film studio "Decadence", St. Petersburg)

References

External links 
 

1914 films
1910s Russian-language films
Russian silent films
Russian black-and-white films
Films of the Russian Empire